Trichauxa albovittata is a species of beetle in the family Cerambycidae. It was described by Stephan von Breuning in 1966.

Subspecies
 Trichauxa albovittata albovittata Breuning, 1966
 Trichauxa albovittata descarpentriesi Breuning, 1975

References

Desmiphorini
Beetles described in 1966